Rakan Al-Hafdhi (born 11 September 1995) is a Saudi Arabian professional footballer who plays as a forward for Al-Washm.

Career
Al-Hafdhi started his career at Ohod in Saudi First Division and signed his first contract on 20 August 2015. He scored 5 goals and made 14 appearances as Ohod earned promotion to the Pro League in the 2016–17 season. and landed with Ohod from the Saudi Professional League to the Prince Mohammad bin Salman League in 2018-19 season . On 29 January 2020, Al-Hafdhi joined Al-Ansar on a six-month loan deal.

On 14 September 2022, Al-Hafdhi joined Al-Washm.

References

External links 
 

1995 births
Living people
Saudi Arabian footballers
Saudi Arabia youth international footballers
Ohod Club players
Al-Ansar FC (Medina) players
Al-Sahel SC (Saudi Arabia) players
Al-Washm Club players
Saudi First Division League players
Saudi Professional League players
Saudi Second Division players
Association football forwards